The Daewoo FX212 Super Cruiser (hangul:대우 FX212 슈퍼 크루저) (later renamed in 2017 as the Daewoo FX212 Super Star (hangul:대우 FX212 슈퍼 스타)) is a heavy-duty luxury coach manufactured by the South Korean bus producer Daewoo. It was introduced in 2007, part of the FX series of current coaches that started with the FX115 and FX116 Cruising Arrow, and the FX120 Cruising Star. It is primarily available as luxury hi-decker tourist buses. It is assembled in Ulsan, South Korea. It is distinguishable by an 'FX212 Super Cruiser' or 'FX212 Super Star' badge, but the common Daewoo badge is usually on the rear. Principal competitors has been both the Hyundai Universe and Kia Granbird.

See also
Daewoo FX115/FX116 Cruising Arrow
Daewoo FX120 Cruising Star

External links
http://www.daewoobus.co.kr/newsite/HTML/showroom/showroom.php

FX212 Super Cruiser
Buses of South Korea
Coaches (bus)
Single-deck buses
Rear-wheel-drive vehicles
Vehicles introduced in 2007